Rock 'til You Drop is the twentieth studio album by English rock band Status Quo and their last on the Vertigo label after nearly 20 years. Singer and guitarist Francis Rossi produced the album.

"Rossi is particularly fond of 1991's Rock 'til You Drop," reported Classic Rock a decade later. "[Guitarist Rick] Parfitt hates the record."

The album closes with a version of "Forty Five Hundred Times" that's one verse and three minutes longer than the Hello! original. "We were trying to make the song current for that incarnation of the band," said Rossi. "Whether or not we were successful in that… well, probably not. Musically speaking, it will have been tidier than the original – the playing would have improved. But, as we discovered on the [Frantic Four's 2013] reunion tour, that's not really what it's all about. After doing it live again three years later, we went, 'What the fuck's this extra verse all about?' – and we got rid of it."

Track listing
 "Like a Zombie" (Francis Rossi, Bernie Frost) 5:03
 "All We Really Wanna Do" (Francis Rossi, Bernie Frost) 3:47
 "Fakin' the Blues" (Francis Rossi, Bernie Frost) 4:29
 "One Man Band" (Rick Parfitt, Pip Williams) 4:31
 "Rock 'til You Drop" (Andy Bown) 3:21
 "Can't Give You More" (Francis Rossi, Bob Young) 4:27
 "Warning Shot" (Andy Bown, John Edwards) 3:58
 "Let's Work Together" (Wilbert Harrison) 3:41
 "Bring It On Home" (Sam Cooke) 3:10
 "No Problems" (Francis Rossi, Rick Parfitt) 4:51
 "Good Sign" (Rick Parfitt, Pip Williams) 4:15 *
 "Tommy" (Francis Rossi, Bernie Frost) 3:50 *
 "Nothing Comes Easy" (Francis Rossi, Rick Parfitt, Andy Bown, John Edwards, Jeff Rich) 5:46 *
 "Fame or Money" (Francis Rossi, Andy Bown) 4:06 *
 "The Price of Love" (Don Everly, Phil Everly) 3:39 *
 "Forty Five Hundred Times" (Francis Rossi, Rick Parfitt) 12:56 *
 * Not on LP version.

Personnel
Status Quo
Francis Rossi - vocals, lead guitar
Rick Parfitt - vocals, rhythm guitar
Andy Bown - keyboards, piano
John Edwards - bass guitar
Jeff Rich - drums

Chart positions

References

1991 albums
Status Quo (band) albums
Vertigo Records albums